Uncial 0146 (in the Gregory-Aland numbering), ε 037 (Soden), is a Greek uncial manuscript of the New Testament, dated palaeographically to the 8th century.

Description 
The codex contains a small part of the Gospel of Mark 10:37-45, on one parchment leaf (27 cm by 21 cm). It is written in two columns per page, 20 lines per page, in uncial letters. 

The Greek text of this codex is mixed. Kurt Aland placed it in Category III.

It is dated by the Institute for New Testament Textual Research to the 8th century.

The codex used to be held in Qubbat al-Khazna in Damascus. The present location of the codex is unknown. The manuscript is not accessible.

See also 

 List of New Testament uncials
 Biblical manuscript
 Textual criticism

References 

Greek New Testament uncials
8th-century biblical manuscripts
Lost biblical manuscripts